Leander Dendoncker (born 15 April 1995) is a Belgian professional footballer who plays as either a defender or defensive midfielder for Premier League club Aston Villa and the Belgium national team.

He joined Anderlecht in 2009 and made his professional debut in July 2013, going on to play 171 games for the club and score 11 goals. He won two Belgian Super Cups and a Belgian First Division A title. In 2018, he signed for Wolverhampton Wanderers on loan before transferring for €15 million. He made 159 appearances and scored 12 goals, then moved to fellow Premier League team Aston Villa for an undisclosed fee.

Dendoncker made his senior international debut for Belgium in June 2015 and was part of their squad that finished third at the 2018 FIFA World Cup, also featuring at UEFA Euro 2020 and the 2022 World Cup.

Club career

Anderlecht
Dendoncker transferred from K.S.V. Roeselare to R.S.C. Anderlecht in 2009, choosing that club ahead of Standard Liège, Club Brugge and K.R.C. Genk. After performances for the youth team in the NextGen Series and a training camp in Turkey, he was incorporated into the first team in January 2013. He models his game on that of the Spanish midfielder Sergio Busquets.

He made his professional debut on 21 July in the 2013 Belgian Super Cup, replacing Dennis Praet for the final nine minutes of the 1–0 win over Genk at the Constant Vanden Stock Stadium. On 26 September, he extended his contract until 2016.

However, it was not until 1 August 2014 that he debuted in the Belgian Pro League, on the first day of the season away to KV Oostende. After scoring his first professional goal on 18 January 2015 in a 3–0 win at Lierse S.K., Dendoncker was praised by former Anderlecht player Paul Van Himst, who said that there was no better player at his position in the club. He played six matches in the 2014–15 Belgian Cup, which his team lost 2–1 in the final to Brugge.

Anderlecht won the 2016–17 Belgian First Division A. Dendoncker scored five goals along the way, including two on 18 December in a 4–0 home win over K.A.S. Eupen. He also played all 16 games in their European campaign that season, which ended with elimination by eventual winners Manchester United in the quarter-finals of the UEFA Europa League. In the first leg of that tie on 13 April 2017, he scored a late equaliser in a 1–1 draw.

Wolverhampton Wanderers
On 9 August 2018, Dendoncker moved to newly promoted English Premier League club Wolverhampton Wanderers on an initial season-long loan with an obligation on Wolves to make the player a permanent Wolves signing in summer 2019. He made his debut on 28 August in the second round of the EFL Cup away to Sheffield Wednesday (2–0 victory), with coach Nuno Espírito Santo making nine changes from the previous game. In late September, The Football Association rejected the obligatory purchase clause in Dendoncker's Wolves contract and made his deal permanent for €15 million. 

He finally made a league appearance on 5 December in a 2–1 win against Chelsea, playing the final nine minutes in place of goalscorer Raúl Jiménez, and scored his first Premier League goal on his sixth appearance in the competition, in a 1–3 win at Everton on 2 February 2019.

Dendoncker committed a foul in the Wolves penalty area with just 180 seconds remaining of their April 2019 FA Cup semi-final with Watford while leading 2–1, thereby conceded the penalty that enabled the opponents to draw the game and then win in extra time. On 4 May he scored the only goal of a home win over Fulham, which enabled Wolves to make the Europa League as a result of Watford losing the cup final.

Dendoncker became a permanent Wolves signing on 1 July 2019, his original loan agreement having included an obligation on the club to sign him permanently at the end of the original season-long loan period. Following the introduction of Video Assistant Referees (VAR) by the Premier League for the 2019–20 season, he was the first Wolves player to have a 'goal' ruled out using VAR in a league match during Wolves' opening fixture away to Leicester City on 11 August.

On 14 December 2020, it was announced by Wolverhampton Wanderers that Dendoncker had extended his contract with the club until 2023, with an option of a further twelve months available to the club. He made his 100th competitive appearance for the club in an FA Cup 4th Round tie away to non-league Chorley the following 22 January, a game Wolves won 1–0. He scored his first goal of the 2020–21 season at home to West Ham United in a 3–2 loss on 5 April 2021. He scored his first goal in the 2021–22 Premier League season in 2–0 win away to Tottenham Hotspur on 13 February 2022.

Aston Villa 
On 1 September 2022, Dendoncker moved to fellow West Midlands-based Premier League club Aston Villa for an undisclosed fee. Dendoncker made his Aston Villa debut on 16 September 2022, as a substitute in a 1–0 home victory over Southampton.

International career

Dendoncker was first called up for the Belgium national football team on 22 May 2015 by manager Marc Wilmots, along with his Anderlecht teammate Youri Tielemans. He made his debut on 7 June in a friendly game away to France, replacing Jason Denayer for the final five minutes of a 4–3 win.

On 4 June 2018, manager Roberto Martínez named Dendoncker in Belgium's 23-man squad for the 2018 FIFA World Cup in Russia. He made his tournament debut on 29 June in a 1–0 win over England at the Kaliningrad Stadium, with both teams fielding unfamiliar teams having already advanced to the last 16.

Dendoncker was called up by Martínez for UEFA Euro 2020 in May 2021. After starting the first two games, he was replaced for the rest of the tournament for the quarter-finalists once Axel Witsel recovered from injury.

On 8 June 2022, Dendoncker scored his first international goal in a 6–1 home win over Poland in the Nations League.

Personal life
Dendoncker was born in Passendale, West Flanders, to pig farming parents. He is the middle of three footballing sons: younger brother Lars was on the books of Club Brugge KV before moving to Brighton & Hove Albion in 2020, while older Andres played local football and became an agent for his siblings.

Dendoncker moved to Brussels to play for Anderlecht while in their under-15 team and suffered from homesickness while adjusting to the difference between a largely white rural setting and a diverse urban environment. He attended the Sint-Guido-Instituut school in Anderlecht at the time that it was being filmed for the fly-on-the-wall documentary De School van Lukaku (Lukaku's School) focusing on his teammate Romelu Lukaku.

Dendoncker speaks three languages fluently; English, French and Dutch. He has noted that he speaks in West Flemish to his family, but the Brabantian dialect when doing interviews for Anderlecht.

Career statistics

Club

International

Belgium score listed first, score column indicates score after each Dendoncker goal.

Honours
Anderlecht
Belgian First Division A: 2016–17
Belgian Super Cup: 2013, 2014

Belgium
FIFA World Cup third place: 2018

References

External links

 Profile at the Aston Villa F.C. website

1995 births
Living people
Belgian footballers
R.S.C. Anderlecht players
Belgian Pro League players
Belgium youth international footballers
Belgium under-21 international footballers
Belgium international footballers
Footballers from West Flanders
Flemish sportspeople
Association football midfielders
K.S.V. Roeselare players
Wolverhampton Wanderers F.C. players
Aston Villa F.C. players
Premier League players
2018 FIFA World Cup players
UEFA Euro 2020 players
2022 FIFA World Cup players
Belgian expatriate footballers
Expatriate footballers in England
Belgian expatriate sportspeople in England